Marie Anna of Saxony (15 November 1799 – 24 March 1832), (full name: Maria Anna Carolina Josepha Vincentia Xaveria Nepomucena Franziska de Paula Franziska de Chantal Johanna Antonia Elisabeth Cunigunde Gertrud Leopoldina), was a princess of Saxony. She became Grand Duchess of Tuscany by her marriage to Leopold II, Grand Duke of Tuscany.

Family 
Marie Anna was born in Dresden, one of the seven children of Maximilian of Saxony by his first wife Caroline of Bourbon-Parma.

Her father was a son of Frederick Christian, Elector of Saxony. Her mother was a daughter of Ferdinand, Duke of Parma. Through her mother, Maria Anna was also the great-granddaughter of Maria Theresa.

Life 
During her short life she showed a special interest for ancient paintings and classical poetry, acquiring the Liber Interitus by Horace for an unknown but extremely high price. She was inspired by Gnostic writings to write a short poet entitled Chuchotet d'Archont, published posthumously. Along with her husband she was the founding patron of L'Istituto Statale della Ss. Annunziata, the first female boarding school in Florence set up to educate aristocratic and noble young ladies. She died in Italy of tuberculosis she passed onto Auguste, her only surviving daughter.

Marriage and issue 
Her husband's granddaughter Archduchess Luise of Austria described Maria Anna as a "highly nervous girl who was so terrified at the idea of meeting her unknown bridegroom that she refused to leave Dresden unless accompanied by her sister" Princess Maria Ferdinanda of Saxony. As her sister agreed to travel with her, Maria Anna duly married on 16 November 1817 the future Leopold II, Grand Duke of Tuscany, son of Ferdinand III, Grand Duke of Tuscany and his first wife Princess Luisa of Naples and Sicily. During the celebrations, Ferdinand became attached to Maria Anna's sister, and they were later married. Her sister Maria Ferdinanda thus became Maria Anna's stepmother-in-law.

They had four children, only one of whom lived to mature adulthood:

 Carolina Augusta Elisabeth Vincentia Johanna Josepha of Austria (1822–1841)
 Archduchess Auguste Ferdinande of Austria (1825–1864)
 Maria Maximiliana Thekla Johanna Josepha of Austria (1827–1834), died in childhood. 
 Maria Josepha Amalia Carlotta Giovanna (1828-1836), died in childhood. 

After Maria Anna's death at Pisa in 1832, her husband married Princess Maria Antonia of the Two Sicilies.

Ancestry

References

Sources

|-

1799 births
1832 deaths
Saxon princesses
House of Wettin
German classical scholars
Women classical scholars
Austrian princesses
German Roman Catholics
Grand Duchesses of Tuscany
Albertine branch